Marcel Mettelsiefen (born 1978) is a director, cameraman, photographer and producer. His films on Syrian Civil War such as Syria: Children on the Frontline (2014), Children on the Frontline: The Escape (2016) and Watani: My Homeland (2016) have earned him critical appraisal and recognition. Mettelsiefen has won two BAFTA and two Emmy awards and was nominated for an Academy Award in the category Best Documentary Short Subject for Watani: My Homeland at 89th Academy Awards with producer Stephen Ellis.

Mettelsiefen has a background in photo-journalism, and has reported from across the Middle East and Afghanistan. He is the co-founder of the magazine, zenith, one of the leading publications about the Middle East and the Arab world in Germany, and a founding member of the German non-for-profit organisation Candid Foundation.

Mettelsiefen studied political science and medicine at the Humboldt University in Berlin, and photographed within Syria more than twenty-five times. It was in Syria that he moved from photojournalism and then into documentary film-making.

Career
Mettelsiefen has worked for international news agencies in the Middle East, Afghanistan, Iraq and Haiti. In 2004 he started medicine school in Berlin. In 2009 he suspended his studies to go to Afghanistan to work on several photo reportage projects. His photos from that time appear in a book about the controversial airstrike on Kunduz which killed over 100 civilians. Mettelsiefen has been covering the Arab Spring and Syria specifically since April 2011. Since then he has returned to the war-torn country more than twenty times. His reports from Syria have aired on Channel4, PBS Frontline, CNN, Al Jazeera, Canal+ etc.

Filmography
 2016: Watani: My Homeland (Documentary short)  
 2016: Slum Britain: 50 Years On (TV Movie documentary)  
 2016: Children on the Frontline: The Escape (TV Movie documentary)   
 2014-2016: Frontline (TV Series documentary) (2 episodes)  
 2014: Unreported World (TV Series documentary) (1 episode)  
 2014: Syria: Children on the Frontline (TV Movie documentary)

Awards and nominations
 Winner: Rory Peck Award - Children on the Frontline: The Escape, Sony Impact Award for Current Affairs.
 Nominated: Academy Award for Best Documentary (Short Subject) - Watani, My Homeland (2016)
 Winner: Overseas Press Club Award - Children of Syria 
 Winner: Prix Europa prize for Best TV Programme about Cultural Diversity - Children of Syria 
 Winner: AIB Award – International Current Affairs - Children of Syria 
 Winner: Hollywood Foreign Press Awards - TV Documentary/Feature Story of the Year - Children of Syria
 Winner: Hollywood Foreign Press Awards - Journalist of the Year  
 Winner: Columbia DuPont Award - Children of Syria 
 Winner: Prix Italia - Best TV Documentary, Current Affairs - Children on the Frontline, Syria (2014)
 Winner: Cinema for Peace Award - Children on the Frontline, Syria (2014)
 Winner: Cinema for Peace - Children on the Frontline, Syria (2014)
 Winner: International Emmy - Children on the Frontline, Syria (2014)
 Winner: llaria Alpi - Best Documentary Feature - Children on the Frontline, Syria (2014)
 Winner: Grimme Preis - Children on the Frontline, Syria (2014)
 Winner: Bayeux-Calvados Award - Long-Format Television - Children on the Frontline, Syria (2014)
 Winner: Grierson Award - Best Documentary On An International Contemporary Theme - Children on the Frontline, Syria (2014)
 Winner: One World Media - Television Award
 Winner: Edinburgh TV Awards - Producer/Director Debut Award 
 Winner: RTS - International Documentary 
 Winner: BAFTA Current Affairs - Children on the Frontline, Syria (2014)
 Winner: BAFTA CRAFT - Factual Photography - Children on the Frontline, Syria (2014)
 Winner: LA FIGRA Award - Children on the Frontline, Syria (2014)
 Winner: Peabody Awards - Documentary - Children on the Frontline, Syria (2014)
 Winner: Amnesty International Media Awards - Gaby Rado Memorial Award - Children on the Frontline, Syria (2014)
 Nominated: BAFTA CRAFT - Best Newcomer (Marcel Mettelsefien)
 Nominated: Amnesty's Media Award - Documentary - Children on the Frontline, Syria (2014)
 Nominated: Frontline Awards - Broadcast - Children on the Frontline, Syria (2014)
 Winner: International Emmy - Best News Piece - Agony in Aleppo (2014)
 Winner: Hanns-Joachim-Friedrichs-Preis - Agony in Aleppo (2014)
 Winner: FPA ( Foreign Press Awards) - TV Documentary/Feature Story of the Year - Agony in Aleppo (2014)
 Winner: New York Documentary Festival - Homs a City Under Siege (2012)
 Winner: Edward Murrow Award - Homs a City Under Siege (2012)

References

External links
 

Living people
Film people from Munich
1978 births